Archibald Fenner Brockway, Baron Brockway (1 November 1888 – 28 April 1988) was a British socialist politician, humanist campaigner and anti-war activist.

Early life and career
Brockway was born to W. G. Brockway and Frances Elizabeth Abbey in Calcutta, British India. While attending the School for the Sons of Missionaries, then in Blackheath, London (now Eltham College), from 1897 to 1905, he developed an interest in politics. In 1908, Brockway became a vegetarian. Several decades later, during a debate in a House of Lords on animal cruelty, he said: "I am a vegetarian and I have been so for 70 years. On the whole, I think, physically I am a pretty good advertisement for that practice."

After leaving school, he worked as a journalist for newspapers and journals including The Quiver, the Daily News and the Christian Commonwealth. In 1907, Brockway joined the Independent Labour Party (ILP) and was a regular visitor to the Fabian Society. He was appointed editor of the Labour Leader (the newspaper of the ILP, later called the New Leader) and was, by 1913, a committed pacifist. He opposed sending troops to France during the First World War and, through his position as editor of the Labour Leader, was outspoken in his views about the conflict.

On 12 November 1914 he published an appeal for men and women of the military age to join him in forming the No-Conscription Fellowship to campaign against the possibility of the government attempting to introduce conscription in Britain. Brockway acknowledged his wife, Lila Brockway, had the foresight "that those who intended to refuse military service should band themselves together". Lila acted as provisional secretary at their cottage in Derbyshire until the beginning of 1915, when the membership had grown so large that it had become necessary to open an office in London. In London, Catherine Marshall became the Fellowship's political secretary since she was adept at political strategy as the Parliamentary Secretary of the National Union of Women's Suffrage Societies. The No-Conscription Fellowship produced a weekly newspaper, The Tribunal, which was suppressed; through the activity of Joan Beauchamp it continued production, although her refusal to divulge the name of the printer caused her to be charged with contempt of court and held in custody for 10 days. The offices of the Labour Leader were raided in August 1915 and Brockway was charged with publishing seditious material. He pleaded not guilty and was acquitted in court. In 1916 Brockway was again arrested, this time for distributing anti-conscription leaflets. He was fined, and after refusing to pay the fine, was sent to Pentonville Prison for two months.

Shortly after his release Brockway was arrested for a third time for his refusal to be conscripted, after being denied recognition as a conscientious objector. He was handed over to the Army and court-martialled for disobeying orders. As if a traitor, he was held for a night in the Tower of London, in a dungeon under Chester Castle and in Walton Prison, Liverpool, where he edited an unofficial newspaper, the Walton Leader, for conscientious objectors in the prison. This led to his being disciplined, which in turn led to a 10-day prison strike by conscientious objectors before he was transferred to Lincoln Jail, where he spent some time in solitary confinement until finally released in 1919. In October 1950 he revisited the jail with Éamon de Valera, the Irish statesman.

Following his release, he became an active member of the India League, which advocated Indian independence. He became secretary of the ILP in 1923 and later its chairman. Years later, the Government of India honoured him with the third highest civilian award of the Padma Bhushan in 1989.

Political activities, 1924–1935
Brockway stood for Parliament several times, including at Lancaster in 1922 and against Winston Churchill at Westminster Abbey in a 1924 by-election. In 1926, he became the first chairperson of War Resisters' International, serving in this post until 1934. Brockway was a member of the League against Imperialism created in Brussels in 1927.

At the 1929 general election, he was elected as the Member of Parliament for Leyton East as a Labour Party candidate. He polled 11,111 votes and, immediately after the election, the Liberal candidate announced that Brockway had converted him to socialism. His convictions brought him into difficulties with the Labour Party. He was also outspoken in Parliament, and was once "named" (suspended) by the Speaker while demanding a debate on India at Prime Minister's Questions.

In 1931 Brockway lost his seat and the following year he disaffiliated from the Labour Party along with the rest of the ILP. He stood unsuccessfully for the ILP in the 1934 Upton by-election (Upton was a division of West Ham), placed a remote third with only a 3.5% share of the votes cast, and in Norwich in the 1935 election. He also wrote a book on the arms trade, The Bloody Traffic, published by Gollancz Ltd in 1934. According to David Howell, after 1932 Brockway "sought to articulate a socialism distinct from the pragmatism of Labour and the Stalinism of the Communist Party".

In Brockway's science fiction novel, Purple Plague (1935), a sea liner is quarantined for a decade as a result of a plague.  An egalitarian society emerges.

Spanish Civil War
Despite his previous pacifist commitment, he resigned from War Resisters' International, explaining:

He assisted in the recruitment of British volunteers to fight the fascist forces of Francisco Franco in Spain through the ILP Contingent. He sailed to Calais in Feb 1937 and was believed to have been destined for Spain. Among those who went to Spain was Eric Blair (better known as George Orwell) and it is known that Brockway wrote a letter of recommendation for Blair to present to the ILP representatives in Barcelona. Following the Spanish Civil War, he advocated public understanding of the conflict. He wrote a number of articles about the conflict and was influential in getting Orwell's Homage to Catalonia published.

Notwithstanding his support for British participation in the Second World War, he served as Chair of the Central Board for Conscientious Objectors throughout the war, and continued to serve as Chair until his death. He also sought to re-enter Parliament, unsuccessfully contesting wartime by-elections for the ILP at Lancaster in 1941 and Cardiff East in 1942.

After the Second World War

In May 1946, Brockway toured the British occupation zone in Germany as an accredited war correspondent, meeting German socialists and reporting on living conditions there; he wrote about the visit in German Diary, published by the Left Book Club.

Brockway appeared in Hitler's Black Book that contained a list of British subjects and residents who would have been subject to arrest had the Nazi's successfully invaded the UK.  The contents of the book was not publicly known until after the Second World War.

Brockway later rejoined the Labour Party. After the 1950 general election he returned to the House of Commons, following an absence of over 18 years, as the MP for Eton and Slough.

In 1951, he was one of the four founders of the charity War on Want, which fights global poverty. He helped establish the Congress of Peoples Against Imperialism (est. 1945), an organisation he continued to work with throughout the 1950s. His activities there included protesting against the response of the government to the Mau Mau Uprising in the British Kenya Colony.  In this area, he was a part of the larger Movement for Colonial Freedom. From the late 1950s he regularly proposed legislation in Parliament to ban racial discrimination, only to be defeated each time. He strongly opposed the use or possession of nuclear weapons by any nation and was a founding member of the Campaign for Nuclear Disarmament. On 18 July 1961, Brockway was chosen by Speaker Harry Hylton-Foster to ask the first question at the very first Prime Minister's Questions in the current format.

Brockway was a prominent member of the British Humanist Association and South Place Ethical Society where he became an Appointed Lecturer during the 1960s. He gave the 1986 Conway Memorial Lecture on 21 May 1986. The Lecture was titled M D Conway: His Life and Message For Today and was chaired by Michael Foot. The Brockway Room at Conway Hall in London is named after him.

House of Lords
He narrowly lost his seat in the House of Commons at the 1964 election, despite the national swing to Labour at that election, as he was portrayed by his opponents as being the principal cause of immigrants from the West Indies settling in Slough. He subsequently was created a life peer on 17 December 1964 taking the title Baron Brockway, of Eton and of Slough in the County of Buckingham, and took a seat in the House of Lords.

Last years
Brockway continued to campaign for world peace and was for several years the chairman of the Movement for Colonial Freedom. Other important posts held by him include the Presidency of the British Council for Peace in Vietnam, and membership of the Advisory Council of the British Humanist Association. The World Disarmament Campaign was founded by Brockway in 1979, together with Philip Noel-Baker, to work for the implementation of the policies agreed at the 1978 Special Session on Disarmament of the UN General Assembly.

Brockway died on 28 April 1988, aged 99. He was some six months shy of his centenary. Brockway had been twice married: firstly in 1914 (divorced 1945) to Lilla, daughter of the Rev. W. Harvey-Smith; secondly in 1946 to Edith Violet King. By his first marriage, he had four daughters, and by his second, he had a son.

Writings
While he was in prison, Brockway met the prominent peace activist Stephen Henry Hobhouse, and in 1922 they co-authored English prisons to-day: being the report of the Prison system enquiry committee, a devastating critique of the English prison system which resulted in a wave of prison reform that has continued to this day. Brockway wrote over twenty other books on politics and four volumes of autobiography.

 1915 The devil's business; a play and its justification
 1915 Is Britain blameless?
 1916 Socialism for pacifists
 1918? All about the I.L.P.
 1919 The recruit: a play in one act
 1927 A week in India
 1928 A new way with crime
 1930 The Indian crisis
 1931 Hands off the railmen's wages!
 1932 Hungry England
 1933 The bloody traffic
 1934 Will Roosevelt succeed? A study of Fascist tendencies in America
 1935 Purple Plague: A Tale of Love and Revolution (fiction)
 1937 The truth about Barcelona
 1938 Pacifism and the left wing
 1938 Workers' Front
 1940 Socialism can defeat Nazism: together with Who were the friends of fascism, with John McNair
 1942 The way out
 1942 Inside the left; thirty years of platform, press, prison and Parliament
 1942? The C.O. and the community
 1944 Death pays a dividend, with Frederic Mullally
 1946 German diary
 1946 Socialism over sixty years: the life of Jowett of Bradford (1864–1944)
 1949 Bermondsey story; the life of Alfred Salter
 1953? Why Mau Mau?: an analysis and a remedy
 1963 Outside the right; a sequel to 'Inside the left., with George Bernard Shaw
 1963 African socialism
 1967 This shrinking explosive world: a study of race relations
 1973 The colonial revolution
 1977 Towards tomorrow: the autobiography of Fenner Brockway
 1980 Britain's first socialists: the Levellers, Agitators, and Diggers of the English Revolution
 1984 Bombs in Hyde Park?
 1986 98 not out

Tributes

His life and legacy are celebrated in his old constituency of Slough with the now annual FennerFest''', a community arts and culture festival.

A statue of Brockway stands at the entrance to Red Lion Square Park in Holborn, London; it was funded by many involved in the Commonwealth independence movements he supported and was expected to be unveiled after his death. However, he achieved such longevity that it was likely that the original Planning Permission to erect it would run out, causing problems to renew the process. It was decided to ask him to unveil it, he being one of the few private individuals, as opposed to Heads of State to do so. It was damaged (an arm was broken off) by a falling tree in the Great Storm of 1987. The refurbished and insured statue was installed shortly after his death.

A close in the town of Newport in southern Wales is named after him.

See also
 List of peace activists

References

Further reading
 Brockway, Fenner Inside the Left: Thirty Years of Platform, Press, Prison and Parliament'', London: George Allen and Unwin, 1942 [reprint: Spokesman, 2010].

External links
Fenner Brockway: 1960 Racial Discrimination Bill UK Parliament Living Heritage
 Papers of Fenner Brockway at the Churchill Archives Centre
 
 Biography at Peace Pledge Union
 Fenner Brockway talking in 1981 about his early involvement with socialism
 

1888 births
1988 deaths
British anti-war activists
British conscientious objectors
British humanists
British pacifists
British people of the Spanish Civil War
Campaign for Nuclear Disarmament activists
English anti-fascists
English socialists
European democratic socialists
Government and politics of Slough
Independent Labour Party MPs
Independent Labour Party National Administrative Committee members
Labour Party (UK) life peers
Labour Party (UK) MPs for English constituencies
Life peers created by Elizabeth II
Members of the Executive of the Labour and Socialist International
People educated at Eltham College
People from Slough
Place of death missing
Politicians from Kolkata
Recipients of the Padma Bhushan in public affairs
UK MPs 1929–1931
UK MPs 1950–1951
UK MPs 1951–1955
UK MPs 1955–1959
UK MPs 1959–1964
UK MPs who were granted peerages